is a railway station on the Shinano Railway Line in the city of Ueda, Nagano, Japan, operated by the third-sector railway operating company Shinano Railway.

Lines
Ōya Station is served by the 65.1 km Shinano Railway Line and is 34.7 kilometers from the starting point of the line at Karuizawa Station.

Station layout
The station consists of two ground-level opposed side platforms serving two tracks.

Platforms

Adjacent stations

History
The station opened on 20 January 1896. The Ueda Maruko Electric Railway also served the station from 1918 to 1969.

Passenger statistics
In fiscal 2011, the station was used by an average of 2,320 passengers daily.

Surrounding area

See also
 List of railway stations in Japan

References

External links
 

Railway stations in Nagano Prefecture
Railway stations in Japan opened in 1896
Shinano Railway Line
Ueda, Nagano